USS Prime (AM-279) was laid down 15 September 1943 by Gulf Shipbuilding Corp., Chickasaw, Alabama, launched 22 January 1944; sponsored by Mrs. L. W. Thompson, and commissioned 12 September 1944.

World War II Pacific Theatre operations 
Following shakedown off the east coast, USS Prime reported to Service Force Atlantic, Norfolk, Virginia, 1 December 1944. After duty off Bermuda and the east coast, she arrived at the Panama Canal Zone, and reported for duty to the U.S. Pacific Fleet 12 July 1945. In September, while at Okinawa, she was assigned to the Reserve Fleet. Following a change of assignment from the 19th to the U.S. 16th Fleet, she was marked expendable in March 1946. Demilitarized, she steamed to Shanghai, China.

End-of-war deactivation 
 Prime was decommissioned 29 May 1946 and sold to China at Shanghai, China as Yung Feng (MMC-50) (Republic of China Navy), decommissioned and struck from the Naval Register 1 May 1973. Fate unknown.

References

External links 
 Dictionary of American Naval Fighting Ships
 NavSource Online: Mine Warfare Vessel Photo Archive - Prime (AM 279)

Admirable-class minesweepers
Ships built in Chickasaw, Alabama
1944 ships
World War II minesweepers of the United States
Admirable-class minesweepers of the Republic of China Navy